Geeetech, known as Shenzhen Getech Technology Co.,Ltd, is a high technology company mainly known for 3D printing R&D and manufacturing. The company was established in 2013 and is headquartered in Shenzen, China. They are one of the largest 3D printer companies in China, having produced millions of printers and are one of very few open-source 3D printer companies in China. Geeetech currently manufactures 15 different models of 3D printers.

Products 
Geeetech produces a range of low cost fused filament fabrication printers and 3D printer components and filament. They use the open source Marlin and Smartto firmware on their printers.

On December 14, 2021, Geeetech launched a dual-leveling 3D printer, Mizar S.

On September 15, 2022, Geeetech launched its new high-speed FDM 3D printer, Thunder. During the same year, the company introduced its new color mixing 3D printer, Mizar M, which owns two printing head modules.

External links 

 Official website

References 

3D printer companies